Herbert Miller Woodcock (29 June 1888 – 6 October 1957) was an Australian rules footballer who played for St Kilda in the Victorian Football League (VFL).

Woodcock, who was recruited to St Kilda locally, used his powerful build to good effect as a ruck shepherd. Also a butcher by profession, Woodcock participated in the 1913 Grand Final which they lost to Fitzroy. He joined former St Kilda teammates Ernie Sellars and George Morrissey at East Perth in 1915 and played there for three seasons. In 1918 he returned to St Kilda and remained with the club until 1921.

References

Holmesby, Russell and Main, Jim (2007). The Encyclopedia of AFL Footballers. 7th ed. Melbourne: Bas Publishing.

External links

1888 births
Australian rules footballers from Victoria (Australia)
St Kilda Football Club players
East Perth Football Club players
1957 deaths
Australian rules footballers from Adelaide